The Group 13 qualifiers for the 1954 FIFA World Cup were contested by teams from Asia. Following the rejection of entries from India and Vietnam, the group was organized into a three-team round-robin tournament between Japan, the Republic of China, and South Korea. The Republic of China later withdrew, leaving Japan and South Korea to play a pair of matches.

Both matches were played at Meiji Jingu Gaien Stadium due to a refusal by South Korean president Rhee Syng-man to allow the entry of Japanese players. The tournament was played less than a decade after the end of World War II, which ended the occupation of Korea under Japanese rule. South Korea won the first leg 5–1 and drew 2–2 in the second leg to earn qualification to their first FIFA World Cup. It was the last qualification tournament not organized by the Asian Football Confederation (AFC), which was established in May 1954.

Group 13

Japan vs South Korea

South Korea vs Japan

References

External links
1954 FIFA World Cup Switzerland  Preliminaries

AFC Group 13
1954 in Asian football
1954 in Japanese football
South Korea at the 1954 FIFA World Cup
1954 in Taiwanese sport